Colin McLeod, known professionally as Colin Cloud, is a British stage mentalist from Harthill, Scotland, who describes himself as The Real Life Sherlock Holmes. In 2017 he appeared as a semi-finalist on season 12 of America's Got Talent.

Personal life
Cloud was born on 9 January 1987 in Harthill, Scotland. In a 2015 interview with stv Glasgow, Cloud says that he was shy and quiet at school, and that he studied forensic investigation at university. He has stated that he has been inspired by Arthur Conan Doyle's fictional detective, Sherlock Holmes, and the detective's ability to read people.

Cloud began his career by studying a Bachelor of Science (Honours) in forensic investigation, specializing in criminal profiling, at Glasgow Caledonian University (2003-2007)  before abandoning that line to pursue a career in entertainment.

Cloud recently became engaged to Chloe Crawford while working with her on "The Illusionists: Magic of the Holidays".

Early career
Cloud joined Tree of Knowledge as a speaker in 2007. He left the company in 2013 to concentrate on developing a TV and stage career.

Under the name Colin McLeod, Cloud appeared as a contestant on Penn & Teller: Fool Us, where he failed to fool the judges.

In 2012, he appeared on Britain's Got Talent with positive reviews from the four judges. However, McLeod failed to make it through to the live semi-finals.

In 2012, Cloud performed at the Edinburgh International Magic Festival.

Career
Cloud performs both public and private shows. He has taken shows to the Edinburgh Festival Fringe in 2014 to 2016.

In June 2015, Cloud joined the touring magic show, The Illusionists as "The Deductionist".

TV and radio

In 2014,  in collaboration with Don Jack, the partnership Prestige was established. Since then, Cloud has appeared as a guest on Michael McIntyre's Big Show, Loose Women, Steve Wright and The One Show among other TV and radio performances internationally. More recently, Colin was invited to work with the team of BBC's Sherlock - working with series creator Mark Gatiss creating support material for the Sherlock Christmas Special. In 2017, Cloud was a contestant on season 12 of America's Got Talent and reached the semi-finals. He later made an appearance on the Royal Variety Performance. In 2019, Cloud participated in the first season of America's Got Talent: The Champions, where he was eliminated in the preliminary round. He made an appearance as a guest performer alongside season 13 winner, Shin Lim, in the season two finale on 17 February 2020.

Stage shows
 2011: It's All in the Mind.
 2012: Britain's Got Talent
 2014: The Colour Ham 
 2014: Colin Cloud Forensic Mind Reader
 2015: Wild Cabaret (Glasgow)
 2015: Colin Cloud Kills
 2016: Colin Cloud: Exposé
 2017: Dare
 2017: The Illusionists Live
 2017: America's Got Talent
 2017: Royal Variety Performance
 2019: America's Got Talent: The Champions

References

External links
 

Mentalists
1987 births
Living people
Alumni of Glasgow Caledonian University
America's Got Talent contestants